Sedeh District is a district (bakhsh) in Eqlid County, Fars Province, Iran. At the 2006 census, its population was 17,507, in 4,026 families.  The District has two cities: Sedeh & Dezhkord.  The District has three rural districts (dehestan): Aspas Rural District, Dezhkord Rural District, and Sedeh Rural District.

References 

Eqlid County
Districts of Fars Province